Amused to Death is the third studio album by English musician Roger Waters, released 7 September 1992 on Columbia. Produced by Waters and Patrick Leonard, it is mixed in QSound to enhance its spatial feel. The album features the late Jeff Beck on lead guitar on several tracks. The album's title was inspired by Neil Postman's 1985 book Amusing Ourselves to Death.

In 2015, the album was remastered and re-released with new artwork and in different formats, including a new 5.1 surround sound mix by original engineer James Guthrie, assisted by Joel Plante.

Background and production
Roger Waters started working on Amused to Death in 1987 when he first wrote "Perfect Sense." It was several years before the album was released.

Amused to Death was produced by Patrick Leonard, Waters, and was co-produced with Nick Griffiths in London at The Billiard Room, Olympic Studios, CTS Studios, Angel Recording Studios and Abbey Road Studios. The album was engineered by Hayden Bendall, Jerry Jordan, and Stephen McLaughlan and mixed by James Guthrie. The album is mixed in QSound to enhance the spatial feel of the audio, and the many sound effects on the album – rifle range ambience, sleigh-bells, cars, planes, distant horses, chirping crickets, and dogs – all make use of the 3-D facility.

Amused to Death is the only studio album by Waters to not have a tour supporting it, though some songs were performed during the In The Flesh and Us + Them tours. "The Bravery of Being Out of Range" was also performed on his current This Is Not A Drill Tour.

Themes

The album is loosely organized around the idea of an ape randomly switching channels on a television, but explores numerous political and social themes, including critiques of the First Gulf War in "The Bravery of Being Out of Range" and "Perfect Sense".

The first track, "The Ballad of Bill Hubbard", features the voice of World War I veteran . A member of the Royal Fusiliers, he describes finding fellow soldier William "Bill" Hubbard – to whom the album is dedicated – severely wounded on the battlefield. After failed attempts to take him to safety, Razzell is forced to abandon him in no-man's land. The tale is continued at the end of the title track, at the very end of the album, providing a coda to the tragic story, with Razzell describing how he finally found peace. The excerpts are from BBC television's 1991 Everyman documentary, "A Game of Ghosts", marking the 75th anniversary of the start of the Battle of the Somme. "I found it very moving," Waters remarked. "That original programme confronted the horrors of war and told the real story. It was an example of television taking its responsibilities seriously." The opening track also features the sound of several animals.

The second song, "What God Wants, Part I", follows and contrasts the moving words of Razzell by opening with the TV being tuned instead into an excerpt of a child who says, "I don't mind about the war. That's one of the things I like to watch – if it's a war going on. 'Cos then I know if, um, our side's winning, if our side's losing..." he is then interrupted by the channel being changed and a burst of ape-chatter.

"Perfect Sense" is a two-part song about a world where live transmissions of wars are the main form of entertainment. The first part begins with a loud, unintelligible rant, then a backwards message from Waters: "Julia, however, in the light and visions of the issues of Stanley, we changed our minds. We have decided to include a backward message. Stanley, for you, and for all the other book burners." The message climaxes with Waters yelling in the aggressive Scottish voice he used to depict the teacher in The Wall. In the second part, sportscaster Marv Albert narrates a war as if it were a basketball game. "My main inspiration behind the song 'Perfect Sense'," Waters explained, "came from thinking about the days of the Roman Empire, when they would flood the Colosseum and have fights between rival galleys. I've always been intrigued by this notion of war as an entertainment to mollify the folks back home, and the Gulf conflict fuelled that idea." 

"The Bravery of Being Out of Range" includes a reference to a song written by Waters on Pink Floyd's 1977 album Animals, "Sheep", and to "Swing Low, Sweet Chariot". In "Sheep" Waters sings, "I've looked over Jordan and I have seen, things are not what they seem"; in "The Bravery of Being Out of Range" he sings "I looked over Jordan and what did I see? I saw a U.S. Marine in a pile of debris."

"Late Home Tonight, Part I", which opens with the song of a Eurasian skylark, recalls the 1986 US air strike against Libya from the perspective of two "ordinary wives" and a young American F-111 pilot. The lyrics about "when you take the jeans from the refrigerator" reference a 1985 Levi's 501 commercial.

At the beginning of "What God Wants, Part II" Charles Fleischer (better known as the voice of Roger Rabbit) performs the greedy teleevangelist's sermon. The lyrics about God wanting silver, gold and "his secret never to be told" reference the nursery rhyme, One for Sorrow. "What God Wants, Part III" musically references the Pink Floyd songs "Shine On You Crazy Diamond (Part I)", "Echoes" and "Breathe (In the Air)". It ends with an audio clip of Tom Bromley, an elderly WWI veteran, singing "Wait 'Till the Sun Shines, Nellie" a capella. The clip is also from "A Game of Ghosts".

"Too Much Rope" includes the line, "Each man has his price, Bob, and yours was pretty low." "I would sometimes rehearse vocal takes by impersonating Bob Dylan," Waters explained. "That line originally read, 'Each man has his price, my friends…' – so make of that what you will. As a joke, I sang 'Bob' instead, and Pat (Leonard, producer) insisted that we leave it in. So, although it was unintentional, I'm happy that it's there for (Pink Floyd producer) Bob Ezrin. I hope he appreciates it."

The song "Watching TV" (a duet with Don Henley) explores the influence of mass media on the Chinese protests for democracy in Tiananmen Square.

In "It's a Miracle" Waters makes a scathing reference to Andrew Lloyd Webber (whom he would accuse elsewhere of having plagiarised music from Pink Floyd's "Echoes" for sections of the musical The Phantom of the Opera): The same song features a sample from the 1977 low-budget zombie film Shock Waves in which the film's characters wrestle over a flashlight. The title track begins with the lyric, "Doctor, Doctor". "Take Up Thy Stethoscope and Walk" on The Piper at the Gates of Dawn, the first song written by Waters, opens with the same line.

HAL samples
Waters stated in a Rockline interview on February 8, 1993, that he had wanted to use dialogue samples from 2001: A Space Odyssey on the album, specifically HAL 9000's 'dying' monologue. Stanley Kubrick, the film's director, turned him down on the basis that it would open the door to many other people using the sound sample. Others think that Kubrick refused because Pink Floyd had not allowed him to use music from Atom Heart Mother in his film A Clockwork Orange. Waters did use the samples of HAL describing his mind being taken away when performing live – specifically at the beginning of "Perfect Sense, Part I" during his In the Flesh tour, after Kubrick's death, and it was finally incorporated into the Amused to Death album for the 2015 remaster / remix release.

Title 
The album's title was inspired by Neil Postman's book Amusing Ourselves to Death. In Postman's later book The End of Education, he remarks on the album:

Packaging
The album's original artwork features a chimpanzee watching television in reference to Kubrick's film 2001: A Space Odyssey. The image on the TV is a gigantic eyeball staring at the viewer. According to Waters, the ape was "a symbol for anyone who's been sitting with his mouth open in front of the network and cable news for the last 10 years."

Reception

AllMusic described the album as "a masterpiece in the sense that it brings together all of his obsessions in one grand, but not unwieldy, package". Record Collector wrote that the album shows Waters "at his most bleakly inspired since the cautionary parable of The Wall". However, the Los Angeles Times was less favorable, writing "The result is blurred structure (partly improved by the moving old-soldier's tale Waters uses as a framing device), too much repetition and a certain distance and overintellectualization. [...] overall there's a dearth of the good old pop-rock appeal that always lifted the better Pink Floyd records." A negative review came from Chicago Tribune, writing "self-importance doesn't equal profundity, and the world's most mind-blowing engineering couldn't cover up the deterioration of Waters' singing and melodic sense since his days with Floyd." Ultimate Classic Rock included Amused to Death on their list "Top 100 90's Rock Albums".

Legacy
Waters told Classic Rock: "My view is that I've been involved in two absolutely classic albums – The Dark Side of the Moon and The Wall [...] And if you haven't got Amused to Death, you haven't got the full set. So this album – the live one, which pulls together songs from all three albums – hopefully redresses the balance." On 19 September 2013, Waters told BBC HardTalk that Amused to Death has been completely underrated.

On 15 April 2015, Waters announced that the album would be remastered and reissued on 24 July 2015 featuring a new 5.1 multichannel audio mix, as well as a new stereo mix. It was made available in a number of formats, including CD, SACD, Blu-ray and high-resolution downloads. In a review of the 2015 remastering of the album, journalist J.C. Maçek III of Spectrum Culture wrote that "Not every album can be a masterpiece, but Waters has stated that Amused to Death is an underrated effort that serves as a third part to Dark Side of the Moon and The Wall. But it's nowhere near those other albums. The 2015 remastering makes it a good sounding album, but it's just not the kind of infinitely listenable album that Waters is capable of creating." In its review of the 2015 reissue, PopMatters wrote: "not only has Amused to Death aged well musically, it has unfortunately aged well thematically too. [...] Amused to Death was and still is a powerful statement from one of rock music's most literate misanthropes. As time goes on, it gets harder and harder to believe that it slipped under everyone's radar so thoroughly." Drowned in Sound wrote: "Amused to Death stands up on its own as one of the better, more intriguing post-Floyd records".

In 2016 Amused to Death won the Grammy Award for Best Surround Sound Album at the 58th Annual Grammy Awards. The winners were listed as follows:
"James Guthrie, surround mix engineer; James Guthrie & Joel Plante, surround mastering engineers; James Guthrie, surround producer (Roger Waters) 
Label: Columbia/Legacy"

Commercial performance
Amused to Death reached No. 8 on the UK Albums Chart, Waters' first Top 10 as a solo artist in his homeland, and a career high of No. 21 on the Billboard 200, aided by "What God Wants, Part I", which hit No. 4 on Billboard Mainstream Rock Tracks chart in 1992. It was also certified Silver by the British Phonographic Industry for sales of over 60,000 in the UK.

Track listing
All songs written by Roger Waters.

Personnel
Roger Waters – vocals (all tracks except 1), bass guitar (tracks 2 (on intro) and 13), synthesisers (EMU on tracks 2 and 4), acoustic guitar (tracks 11 and 14), twelve-string guitar (track 5) 
Patrick Leonard – keyboards (all tracks except 6 and 7), percussion programming (track 1), choir arrangement (tracks 2, 9-11 and 13), voice (track 4), acoustic piano (tracks 11 and 13), Hammond organ (track 5), synthesisers (tracks 5 and 13)
Jeff Beck – guitar (tracks 1, 2, 5 (2015 reissue only), 10–14)
Randy Jackson – bass (tracks 2 and 9)
Graham Broad – drums (all tracks except 1, 5, 11 and 13), percussion (tracks 6 and 7)
Luis Conte – percussion (all tracks except 2, 5, 9, 11, 13 and 14)
Geoff Whitehorn – guitar (tracks 2, 8, 10 and 14)
Andy Fairweather Low – guitars (tracks 2, 6–9, 11 and 12) including twelve-string guitar (tracks 8 and 12), acoustic guitar (tracks 2 and 11) and electric guitar (track 2), backing vocals (tracks 6 and 7)
Tim Pierce – guitar (tracks 2, 5, 9 and 12)
B.J. Cole – pedal steel guitar (tracks 3 and 4)
Rick DiFonzo – guitar (tracks 3 and 4)
Steve Lukather – guitar (tracks 3, 4 and 8)
David Paich – Hammond organ (track 5, 2015 reissue only)
Bruce Gaitsch – acoustic guitar (tracks 3 and 4)
Jimmy Johnson – bass (all tracks except 1, 2, 5, 9 and 11)
Brian Macleod – snare (tracks 3 and 4), hi-hat (tracks 3 and 4)
John Pierce – bass guitar (track 5)
Denny Fongheiser – drums (track 5)
Steve Sidwell – cornet (tracks 6 and 7)
John Patitucci – bass guitar (track 11)
Guo Yi & the Peking Brothers – dulcimer, lute, zhen, oboe, bass (track 11)
John Dupree – strings arranger and conductor (tracks 3 and 4)
John "Rabbit" Bundrick – Hammond organ (track 12)
Michael Kamen – orchestral arranger and conductor (tracks 7 and 8)
Jeff Porcaro – drums (track 13)
Marv Albert – commentary (track 4)
Alf Razzell – speech (tracks 1 and 14)
London Welsh Chorale – choir (tracks 2, 9-11 and 13)
Katie Kissoon – backing vocals (tracks 2, 8, 9, 12 and 14)
Doreen Chanter – backing vocals (tracks 2, 8, 9, 12 and 14)
N'Dea Davenport – backing vocals (track 2)
Natalie Jackson – backing vocals (tracks 2 and 5)
P.P. Arnold – vocals (tracks 3 and 4)
Lynn Fiddmont-Linsey – backing vocals (track 5)
Jessica Leonard – backing vocals (track 8)
Jordan Leonard – backing vocals (track 8)
Screaming Kids – backing vocals (track 8)
Charles Fleischer - speech (track 9)
Don Henley – vocals (track 11)
Jon Joyce – backing vocals (track 13)
Stan Farber – backing vocals (track 13) (credited as Stan Laurel)
Jim Haas – backing vocals (track 13)
Rita Coolidge – vocals (track 14)

Production
Roger Waters – production
Patrick Leonard – production
Nick Griffiths – co-producer
Hayden Bendall – engineering
Jerry Jordan – engineering
Stephen McLaughlin – engineering
James Guthrie – mixing
Kenneth Bowen – choir conductor (tracks 2, 9-11 and 13)

Charts

Original release

2015 reissue

Certifications

References

Sources

Further reading

External links
 Syndicated 1-hour radio special and transcript devoted to the album
 Alf Razzell interview on which the album draws, at the Imperial War Museum

Roger Waters albums
1992 albums
Concept albums
Columbia Records albums
Albums produced by Roger Waters
Albums produced by Patrick Leonard
Political music albums by English artists
Albums recorded at Olympic Sound Studios
Grammy Award for Best Immersive Audio Album